{{DISPLAYTITLE:C21H25NO2}}
The molecular formula C21H25NO2 (molar mass: 323.43 g/mol) may refer to:
 4-Hydroxy-1-methyl-4-(4-methylphenyl)-3-piperidyl 4-methylphenyl ketone
 PEPAP, an opioid analgesic
 Piperidolate, an antimuscarinic